Boughton is a village in Nottinghamshire, England, two miles east of the town of Ollerton. It was a civil parish until 1996, but the civil parish was then abolished and merged with the civil parish of Ollerton to form the new civil parish of Ollerton and Boughton.

Boughton windmill was located close to the present B6381 road.

The parish church is St Matthew's Church, Boughton.

See also
Boughton (Nottinghamshire) railway station

References

External links

Newark and Sherwood
Villages in Nottinghamshire
Former civil parishes in Nottinghamshire